Shamariyeh (also Romanized as Shamarīyeh, Shemiriyeh, and Shomeyrīyeh; also known as Tall Asvad-e Yek) is a village in Esmailiyeh Rural District, in the Central District of Ahvaz County, Khuzestan Province, Iran. At the 2006 census, its population was 492, in 85 families.

References 

Populated places in Ahvaz County